Staal Jørpeland Idrettslag, also known as just Staal, is a Norwegian sports club from Jørpeland, Rogaland. It has sections for association football, team handball and track and field. The club was founded in 1919, and the club colors are green and black. Their home matches are played at Jørpeland Stadion. 

The men's football team currently plays in the Norwegian Third Division, the fourth tier of Norwegian football, after being relegated from the 2022 Norwegian Second Division.

Football
The men's football team played in the Norwegian Third Division consecutively from 1999 until 2021. In the 2010 season, they were close to moving up to the Second Division. They finished the season in first place, but lost to Viking 2 in the promotion play-offs. In 2021, the club earned promotion to the Second Division after beating Express 4–0 in the last game of the 2021 season.

Recent seasons

Source:

Current squad

References

 Official site 

Football clubs in Norway
Sport in Rogaland
Association football clubs established in 1919
Athletics clubs in Norway
1919 establishments in Norway